Valenciennea wardii, Ward's sleeper, Ward's sleeper goby, is a species of goby native to the Indian Ocean and the western Pacific Ocean in bays, reefs and lagoons at depths of from .  It can be found on sandy or silty substrates.  This species can reach a length of  SL.  It can also be found in the aquarium trade. The specific name honours the United Kingdom diplomat Swinburne Ward (1830-1897) who was Her Majesty's Civil Commissioner for the Seychelles, although this species was described from specimens collected off Zanzibar.

References

External links
 

Valenciennea
Taxa named by Lambert Playfair
Fish described in 1867